Graham Armin Kernwein (October 23, 1904 – January 25, 1983) was an American football halfback who played one season in the National Football League (NFL) for the Racine Tornadoes. He played college football at Chicago and also had a stint with the Chicago Bears.

Early life and education

Kernwein was born on October 23, 1904, in Claremont, Illinois, to Armin and Cora Kernwein. He graduated from Wenona High School in 1922. He was recruited to the University of Chicago, showing "great promise" in his first season on the football team (1923). Playing halfback, Kernwein was reported by the Chicago Tribune as "displaying considerable brilliance at finding the holes [in the line]." He was "used considerably" by coach Amos Alonzo Stagg, with The Pantagraph writing that Kernwein "is regarded as the best bet to succeed John Thomas and Willis Zorn" in 1924.

Kernwein "continue[d] to improve" as a junior in 1924, earning his first varsity letter.

In 1925, The Daily Times reported that "Kernwein has been playing left half-back for the Maroons since the season opened and his stellar open-field running in the Big Ten games that Chicago has played so far this season has enabled Coach Stagg's proteges to defeat Purdue, Northwestern and tie Ohio State." A profile in the Chicago Tribune said "He's a triple threat athlete, with a few more threats tacked on for good measure. He can carry the ball, pass and kick. He can play brilliantly on defense, run fine defense, and he can think ... His speed is one of his greatest assets on the gridiron."

While at Chicago, Kernwein also competed in track, with his specialty being the 220 meters, where his best time was 22 seconds.

A report in the Wenona Index following his second-to-last collegiate football game said the following:

After graduating in 1926, Kernwein was awarded the Big Ten Conference Medal, given to a senior in each school who "has shown superiority in athletics and in scholarship." A report in The Capital Times wrote "Kernwein was an important cog in the Maroon grid machine of 1925 and 1926[sic], his fast running and clever dodging, combined with his kicking and tackling, making him an exceptionally valuable man to Chicago." According to coach Amos Alonzo Stagg, Kernwein also maintained a high grade average in school.

Coach Stagg, a College Football Hall of Famer, later rated Kernwein as one of "the best halfbacks turned out at the Midway" in Stagg's coaching career.

According to The Daily Times, Kernwein was "popular in university activities," and was chosen as a delegate of his fraternity for a national convention held in Denver.

Kernwein took a course in medical surgery at the University of Chicago and later graduated from the University of Chicago Medical School.

Professional career

In September , Kernwein was signed by the Racine Tornadoes of the National Football League (NFL). He made his NFL debut against the Hammond Pros in week one, winning 6–3, with his "brilliant open field running practically w[inning] the game for the Tornadoes." The Journal Times reported his "terrific driving ... pleased mightily" the spectators.

Despite being announced by George Ruetz as "undoubtedly not in condition" to start the next game against the Chicago Cardinals due to an illness, Kernwein played through the full game, a 0–20 loss. Against the Milwaukee Badgers in week three, Kernwein started and played through the entire game, a 2–13 loss. He missed the fourth game of the season, a loss to the Duluth Eskimos, with the flu.

A profile in the Green Bay Press-Gazette said of Kernwein: "A fast, slippery man who has proven the most consistent ground gainer on the Tornado squad. Does most of the Racine punting and is on the throwing end of many passes. Especially good, because of his speed at going around the ends." He started at right halfback in a 0–35 loss to the Green Bay Packers, the last game of the season for Racine, as they folded shortly afterwards.

In , Kernwein was signed by the Chicago Bears, and scored a touchdown in an exhibition win against Ken Osbourne's Suburbans. He did not appear in any regular season games with the Bears.

Later life and death
Kernwein announced his engagement to Dorothy Rice in July 1926. He married Elva Staud in February 1936.

Kernwein was later an orthopedic surgeon at Rockford for 32 years, being rated one of the top bone specialists in the country.

Kernwein served in the Army Medical Corps during World War II, and achieved the rank of lieutenant colonel. He became in charge of the Camp Ellis army hospital in 1944.

Kernwein was a member of the American Medical Association and was a diplomat of the American Board of Surgery, as well as the American Board of Orthopedic Surgery.

Kernwein wrote many papers of medical literature and was writing a book on surgical procedure when he died in 1983, at the age of 78.

References

1904 births
1983 deaths
American football halfbacks
Players of American football from Illinois
Chicago Maroons football players
Racine Tornadoes players
Chicago Bears players